Steve Reid is an American jazz percussionist and founding member of The Rippingtons. He co-founded The Rippingtons in 1987 and played with Supertramp in 1987–88. In 1993, 1995, and 1997 he was named Percussionist of the Year by Jazziz magazine.

Discography

As leader
 Bamboo Forest (Sugo, 1994)
 Water Sign (Telarc, 1996)
 Mysteries (Telarc, 1997)
 Dream Scapes (Eagle Music Group, 2001)

As sideman
With Rob Mullins
 Tokyo Nights (Nova, 1990)

References

External links

American jazz drummers
The Rippingtons members
Domo Records artists
Telarc Records artists
1944 births
Living people